Nick Cross or variants may refer to:

Nick Cross (animator) (born c. 1971), Canadian independent animator
Nick Cross (American football) (born 2001), professional American football safety
Nic Cross (born 1999), professional Canadian football linebacker
Nicky Cross (born 1961), English footballer